The women's artistic individual all-around competition at the 2015 Southeast Asian Games was held on 8 June 2015 at the Bishan Sports Hall in Singapore.

Medalists

Schedule
All times are Singapore Standard Time (UTC+8).

Qualification

Qualification took place on 7 June 2015 as part of the team and individual qualification event.

Results

References 

Women's artistic individual all-around
Women's sports competitions in Singapore
2015 in women's gymnastics